Belle and Sebastian Write about Love (known informally as Write about Love) is the eighth studio album by indie pop group Belle and Sebastian, released on 11 October 2010. It was the second collaboration between the band and Tony Hoffer, who had produced their previous album, The Life Pursuit (2006).

History
The album was first referenced by the group in early 2010, when they mentioned in the Q&A section of their official website that they had recently visited Los Angeles, California, to record. In a follow-up question, Stuart Murdoch confirmed that producer Tony Hoffer had returned to produce. The album's title was officially announced by Murdoch in a posting on the band's website on 11 August 2010, and he revealed the album cover and release dates, as well as a clip of a planned Belle and Sebastian television show, on 16 August.

Two tracks from the album were played by the band during their 2010 tour: "I Didn't See It Coming", a duet featuring Sarah Martin and Stuart Murdoch on vocals, and "I'm Not Living in the Real World", which features Stevie Jackson on lead vocals. On 16 August 2010, another track was announced, titled "I Want the World to Stop". Norah Jones is featured on the track "Little Lou, Ugly Jack, Prophet John", which was also included on Jones' compilation album ...Featuring Norah Jones, released one month after Write About Love.

On 3 September 2010, the names of five new songs set to feature on the album were shown during the credits of the promotional Belle and Sebastian TV programme: "Blue Eyes of a Millionaire", "Suicide Girl", and "I Can See Your Future" (all credited to the group), as well as "The Telephone Song" and "If I Can't Help Myself" (both credited to guitarist Stevie Jackson). Of these songs, only "I Can See Your Future" ended up on the album, though "Blue Eyes of a Millionaire" and "Suicide Girl" were included as bonus tracks on some editions.

The title track was announced as the lead single from the album, and was also released as a free download from the band's website for a limited-time. The single was released in the US iTunes Store on 7 September 2010, with a worldwide release on 25 September. "I Want the World to Stop" topped Allaccess.com's "Impacting Songs" US radio chart on 5 October 2010.

Commercial performance
Its first week of release, the album entered the UK Albums Chart, where it peaked at number 8, the band's highest placement on the chart (tied with The Life Pursuit and A Bit of Previous). Additionally, the album topped the UK Independent Albums chart, and "I Didn't See It Coming" entered the UK Independent Singles chart at number 38. The album reached number 21 in Ireland, the band's highest placement in that country until their next album. In the United States, Write About Love peaked at number 15 on the Billboard 200, the band's highest placement on the chart, while it entered the Italian albums chart at number 65, nine spots lower than The Life Pursuit, which had reached number 56.

In 2011, the album was awarded a silver certification from the Independent Music Companies Association, indicating sales of at least 20,000 copies throughout Europe. As of 2014, it has sold 68,199 copies in United States.

Track listing

Personnel

Norah Jones – vocals (5)
Carey Mulligan – vocals (6)
Mick Cooke – arranger
Sarah Martin – arranger (10)
Tony Hoffer – producer, mixing, programming
Todd Burke – engineer
Cameron Lister – assistant engineer
Frank Arkwright – mastering
Stuart Murdoch – vocals, liner notes, photography
Marisa Privitera – assistant
Seth Mitchell – guest guitar
Eric Gorfain – violin, conductor (4, 6, 10)
Daphne Chen – violin (4, 6, 10)
Melissa Reiner – violin (4, 6, 10)
Amy Wickman – violin (4, 6, 10)
Wes Precourt – violin (4, 6, 10)
Lauren Chipman – viola (4, 6, 10)
Richard Dodd – cello (4, 6, 10)
Matt Cooker – cello (4, 6, 10)
John Krovoza – cello (4, 6, 10)
Noah Gladstone – trombone (4, 10)
Bruce Otto – bass trombone  (4, 10)
Stephanie Stetson – French horn (10)
Danielle Ondarza – French horn (10)
Stephanie O'Keefe – French horn (10)

Charts

References

External links
Belle & Sebastian's official website

2010 albums
Belle and Sebastian albums
Rough Trade Records albums
Albums produced by Tony Hoffer